Chen Yao is the name of:

 Chen Yao (volleyball) (born 1988), Chinese volleyball player
 Chen Yao (Dota player) (born 1990), Chinese video game player
 Chen Yao (actress) (born 1994), Chinese actress

See also
 Yao Chen (born 1979), Chinese actress and philanthropist